Benny Anderssons orkester (also known as BAO, Benny Andersson Band) is a Swedish band, with Benny Andersson as musical leader and composer. The band was formed in mid-2001 by 16 people, some from Orsa Spelmän, and Helen Sjöholm and since 2004 Tommy Körberg as singers. The name literally means "Benny Andersson's orchestra".

Members
BAO includes some of Sweden's most experienced contemporary and folk musicians:

 Benny Andersson - accordion, piano, synclavier, etc.
 Göran Arnberg - pipe organ, spinet
 Janne Bengtson - flute, piccolo, crumhorn, baritone saxophone
 Pär Grebacken - saxophones, clarinet, recorder, piccolo
 Leif Göras - violin, cello, mandolin
 Nicke (Nils-Erik) Göthe - violin, mandolin
 Jogga (Jan-Anders) Ernlund - contrabass
 Calle Jakobsson - tuba, valve trombone
 Leif Lindvall - trumpet, cornet
 Kalle Moraeus - violin, zither, guitar, banjo, etc.
 Olle Moraeus - violin, viola, mandolin
 Perra (Per-Erik) Moraeus - violin, mandolin, saxophone
 Lars Rudolfsson - accordion
 Jörgen Stenberg - drums, percussion instruments
 Tommy Körberg - vocals, guitar
 Helen Sjöholm - vocals, originally chosen as a backup singer, but is now also considered a permanent member of the band

All members of the band are occupied in external capacities during the majority of the year, some in the theater orchestras in Stockholm. The brothers Moraeus, Leif Göras and Nicke Göthe play together in Orsa Spelmän. During the summers the members of BAO meet up and rehearse, and then go out on mini-tours, to which tickets are highly sought after. The concept of these tours are “A concert with dance,” so a dance floor is brought along. Tommy Körberg and Helen Sjöholm together perform the vocals for the non-instrumental songs.

Discography

Albums

Singles

Svensktoppen

Awards and nominations

Grammis

Grammis is a national Swedish music prize governed by IFPI Sweden and awarded annually in numerous categories for best recordings released in the previous year.

Following are the Grammis awards and nominations received by Benny Anderssons orkester:

Other appearances
Beginner's Guide to Scandinavia (3CD, Nascente 2011)

References

External links
 BAO official website (in Swedish)
Benny Andersson Band, official website
Mono Music, label, official website
icethesite - Benny Andersson and Björn Ulvaeus news site - with latest BAO news
Official Facebook page

Swedish musical groups
ABBA
Musical groups established in 2001
2001 establishments in Sweden